Jiangsu Huge Horses is a baseball team and a member of the China Baseball League. In 2015, Pegasus defeated the Beijing Tigers two games to none to win their first-ever championship.

References

External links 
 CBL Official site 

Baseball in China
Sport in Beijing